Highway 724 is a highway in the Canadian province of Saskatchewan. It runs from Highway 614 to the Alberta border, where it continues eastward as Highway 515.

Highway 724 passes near the community of Maple Creek. Highway 724 also connects with Highways 21 and 271.

See also 
Roads in Saskatchewan
Transportation in Saskatchewan

References 

724